The minimum wage in Poland is the lowest monthly or hourly remuneration that employers are legally allowed to pay their workers in Poland. The sum is decided by the Polish government.

On 7 July 1994 Polish złoty (PLZ) was denominated at a rate 10000:1 to new Polish złoty (PLN). The new currency was introduced on 1 January 1995, and was used concurrently with the old one until the end of 1996.

See also
List of European countries by minimum wage

References

Economy of Poland
Poland